This is a list of papal legates sent by the Holy See to England. The legature was suppressed under Henry VIII, and restored under his daughter Mary I (reigned from 1553 to 1558).

Legates, 1066–1558
1070      - Hubert, signatory of the Accord of Winchester
1095 - Walter of Albano
1101- Guy, Archbishop of Vienna (Later Pope Callixtus II)
1115–1120? - Anselm of St Saba
1125  - John of Crema
1126–1130 - William de Corbeil
1132–1136 - William of Corbeil
1138–1139 - Alberic of Ostia
1139–1143 - Henry of Blois, Bishop of Winchester
1149-1159 - Theobald of Bec, Archbishop of Canterbury
1190      - William Longchamp
1213      - Niccolò de Romanis, Bishop of Tusculum
1213–1216 - Pandulf Verraccio, later Bishop of Norwich (as legatus missus/nuncio)
1216–1218 - Guala Bicchieri
1218–1221 - Pandulf Verraccio, later Bishop of Norwich
1237/1240 - Otto of Tonengo
1265–1268 - Ottobuono Fieschi, later Pope Adrian V
1518–1530 - Thomas Wolsey
1536–1557 - Reginald Pole
1557–1558 - William Petow

Notes

References
 
  
 

Catholic Church in England
+
Legates
Vatican City-related lists
papal legates
Kingdom of England-related lists
Lists of Roman Catholics